Slagle Creek may refer to:

Slagle Creek (Brush Creek), a stream in Missouri
Slagle Creek (Little Sac River), a stream in Missouri
Slagle Creek (Applegate River tributary), a stream in Oregon